Huang Chiu-chin (born 17 October 1978) is a Taiwanese taekwondo practitioner. 

She won a gold medal in finweight at the 1995 World Taekwondo Championships in Manila, after defeating Yang So-hee in the final.

References

External links

1978 births
Living people
Taiwanese female taekwondo practitioners
World Taekwondo Championships medalists
20th-century Taiwanese women